The 2013 BET Hip Hop Awards was held on October 15, 2013 at Atlanta Civic Center in the ATL. Snoop Dogg was the event's host for the first time. Kendrick Lamar leads the nominations with 14. Drake had the second most at 13, while J. Cole picked up 10 nods. Kendrick Lamar won the most awards with 5 wins.

There was some controversy as Toronto battle rapper Charron won Freestyle Friday's March Mayhem Tournament, which guaranteed him a spot in the 2013 BET Hip Hop Awards cypher as one of the prizes for his victory. However, once it came time to film the cyphers, Charron was excluded. He responded with the "BET Cypher Verse" where he disses BET, Murda Mook, Gucci Mane, Soulja Boy, Lil Twist, Rick Ross, Kendrick Lamar and Chief Keef, among others.

Performances 
 "Dreams and Nightmares"/"Levels" – Meek Mill
 "Act Right"/"U.O.E.N.O."/"Type of Way" – Yo Gotti, Rocko & Rich Homie Quan
 "Fork"/"Go DJ"/"Used 2"/"Back That Azz Up" – 2 Chainz feat. Mannie Fresh & Juvenile
 "Honest"/"I Wanna Be with You"/"No Games" – Future, DJ Khaled, & Rick Ross
 "Collard Greens"/"Money Trees" – Schoolboy Q, Kendrick Lamar & Jay Rock
 "Ain't Worried About Nothin'" (Remix) – French Montana feat. Diddy, Snoop Dogg & Rick Ross
 "Thuggish Ruggish Bone"/"1st of tha Month"/"Crossroads" – Bone Thugs-N-Harmony feat. Claudette Ortiz

Cyphers 
 Internet Exclusive Cypher – Asia Sparks, La ' Vega, Bad Lucc, Problem, & Astro
 Cypher 1 – Wax, Rapsody, Emis Killa, Rittz, & Jon Connor
 Cypher 2 – ASAP Ferg, ASAP Twelvy, ASAP Nast, ASAP Ant, & ASAP Rocky of ASAP Mob
 Cypher 3 – Action Bronson, Star Life Breezy, Travis Scott, Tiffany Foxx, & Lil' Kim
 Cypher 4 – Slaughterhouse (Joell Ortiz, Royce da 5'9", Crooked I, & Joe Budden)
 Cypher 5 – ScHoolboy Q, Jay Rock, Ab-Soul, Isaiah Rashad, & Kendrick Lamar of Top Dawg Entertainment
 Cypher 6 – J. B. Smoove, Duane Martin, Boris Kodjoe, Nick Cannon, Nelly, & Chocolate Drop (aka Kevin Hart) of Real Husbands of Hollywood

Nominations

Best Hip Hop Video 
Drake – "Started From the Bottom"
 A$AP Rocky featuring Drake, 2 Chainz & Kendrick Lamar – "Problems"
 B.o.B featuring T.I. & Juicy J – "We Still In This"
 J. Cole featuring Miguel – "Power Trip"
 Kendrick Lamar – "Don't Kill My Vibe"

Reese's Perfect Combo Award (Best Collabo, Duo or Group) 
A$AP Rocky featuring Drake, 2 Chainz & Kendrick Lamar – "Problems"
 Ace Hood featuring Rick Ross & Future – "Bugatti"
 J. Cole featuring Miguel – "Power Trip"
 French Montana featuring Rick Ross, Drake & Lil Wayne – "Pop That"
 Kendrick Lamar featuring Drake – "Poetic Justice"
 Wale featuring Tiara Thomas – "Bad"

Best Live Performer 
 Jay Z
 2 Chainz
 J. Cole
 Kendrick Lamar
 Kanye West

Lyricist of the Year 
Kendrick Lamar
 J. Cole
 Drake
 Jay Z
 Wale

Video Director of the Year 
Benny Boom
 A$AP Rocky & A$AP Ferg
 Director X
 Dre Films
 Hype Williams

DJ of the Year 
DJ Drama
 DJ Envy
 DJ Funkmaster Flex
 DJ Khaled
 DJ Scream

Producer of the Year 
Mike Will Made It
 J. Cole
 Hit-Boy
 DJ Mustard
 Pharrell Williams

MVP of the Year 
 Kendrick Lamar
 2 Chainz
 J. Cole
 Drake
 Jay Z

Track of the Year 
Only the producer of the track nominated in this category.
"Started From the Bottom" – Produced by Mike Zombie & Noah "40" Shebib (Drake)
"Power Trip" – Produced by J. Cole (J. Cole featuring Miguel)
"Problems" – Produced by Noah "40" Shebib (A$AP Rocky featuring Drake, 2 Chainz & Kendrick Lamar)
"Don't Kill My Vibe" – Produced by Sounwave (Kendrick Lamar)
"Bugatti" – Produced by Mike Will Made It (Ace Hood featuring Rick Ross & Future)

Album of the Year 
Kendrick Lamar – good kid, m.A.A.d city
 J. Cole – Born Sinner
 Jay Z – Magna Carta Holy Grail
 Nas – Life Is Good
 Wale – The Gifted

Who New? Rookie of the Year 
 A$AP Ferg
 Action Bronson
 Earl Sweatshirt
 Joey Bada$$
 Trinidad Jame$

Hustler of the Year 
 Jay Z
 Diddy
 Kendrick Lamar
 T.I.
 Kanye West

Made-You-Look Award 
A$AP Rocky (tie)
Nicki Minaj (tie)
 2 Chainz
 Jay Z
 Kendrick Lamar
 Kanye West

Best Hip Hop Online Site 
WorldStarHipHop.com
 Allhiphop.com
 Complex.com
 GlobalGrind.com
 RapRadar.com

Best Club Banger 
French Montana featuring Rick Ross, Drake & Lil Wayne – "Pop That" (Produced by Lee on the Beats)
 Ace Hood featuring Rick Ross & Future – "Bugatti" (Produced by Mike Will Made It)
 A$AP Rocky featuring Drake, 2 Chainz & Kendrick Lamar – "Problems" (Produced by Noah "40" Shebib)
 Drake – "Started From the Bottom" (Produced by Mike Zombie & Noah "40" Shebib)
 Trinidad Jame$ – "All Gold Everything" (Produced by Devon Gallaspy)

Best Mixtape 
Big Sean – Detroit
 Chance the Rapper – Acid Rap
 Travi$ Scott – Owl Pharaoh
 Stalley – Honest Cowboy
 Trinidad Jame$ – Don't Be S.A.F.E.

Sweet 16 (Best Featured Verse) 
Kendrick Lamar – "Problems" (A$AP Rocky featuring Drake, 2 Chainz & Kendrick Lamar)
 Diddy – "Same Damn Time (Remix)" (Future featuring Diddy & Ludacris)
 Drake – "Versace (Remix)" (Migos featuring Drake)
 Future – "Bugatti" (Ace Hood featuring Rick Ross & Future)
 Wiz Khalifa – "U.O.E.N.O. (Remix)" (Rocko featuring Future & Wiz Khalifa)

Impact Track 
J. Cole featuring TLC – Crooked Smile
 Jay Z featuring Justin Timberlake – Holy Grail
 Macklemore & Ryan Lewis featuring Mary Lambert – Same Love
 Wale featuring Sam Dew – LoveHate Thing
 Kanye West – BLKKK SKKKN HEAD

People's Champ Award 
Drake – "Started From the Bottom"
 A$AP Rocky featuring Drake, 2 Chainz & Kendrick Lamar – "Problems"
 J. Cole featuring Miguel – "Power Trip"
 Kendrick Lamar – "Don't Kill My Vibe"
 Macklemore & Ryan Lewis featuring Ray Dalton – Can't Hold Us

I Am Hip Hop Award 
MC Lyte

References 

BET Hip Hop Awards
2013 music awards